Adamite is a zinc arsenate hydroxide mineral, Zn2AsO4OH. It is a mineral that typically occurs in the oxidized or weathered zone above zinc ore occurrences. Pure adamite is colorless, but usually it possess yellow color due to Fe compounds admixture. Tints of green also occur and are connected with copper substitutions in the mineral structure. Olivenite is a copper arsenate that is isostructural with adamite and there is considerable substitution between zinc and copper resulting in an intermediate called cuproadamite. Zincolivenite is a recently discovered mineral being an intermediate mineral with formula CuZn(AsO4)(OH). Manganese, cobalt, and nickel also substitute in the structure. An analogous zinc phosphate, tarbuttite, is known.

Occurrence
Adamite occurs as a secondary mineral in the oxidized zone of zinc- and arsenic-bearing hydrothermal mineral deposits. It occurs in association with smithsonite, hemimorphite, scorodite, olivenite, calcite, quartz and iron and manganese oxides.

The yellow to bright lime-green colored crystals and druze along with its distinctive fluorescence make adamite a favorite among mineral collectors. Found in Mapimí, Durango, Mexico; Greece; and California and Utah in the United States.

Adamite was named after the French mineralogist Gilbert-Joseph Adam (1795–1881). It was first described in 1866 for an occurrence at the type locality of Chañarcillo, Copiapó Province, Atacama Region, Chile.

See also
 List of minerals
 List of minerals recognized by the International Mineralogical Association
 List of minerals named after people

References

Zinc minerals
Arsenate minerals
Orthorhombic minerals
Minerals in space group 58
Luminescent minerals
Minerals described in 1866